Commander Albert Wesley Anderson (23 July 1907 – 18 June 1986) was the son of The Rt Hon. Sir Robert Newton Anderson and Lydia "Lily" Elizabeth Smith, a businessman, member of Londonderry Corporation and Mayor of Derry (from 1963 to 1968).

Albert Anderson was born in County Londonderry and educated at Foyle College in Derry and at Rydal School (Wales), followed by the University of Nottingham. He served as a Commander in the Royal Navy during the Second World War. Member of Londonderry Corporation until 1969.  He was Mayor of Derry (and ex officio Member of the Senate of Northern Ireland) from 1963 to 1968. During this period, he was a leading figure in the unsuccessful campaign to site a new university in Derry.

He was elected Ulster Unionist Party Member of Parliament for the City of Londonderry from the by-election of 16 May 1968 until the prorogation of the Stormont Parliament in 1972. Anderson was Senior Parliamentary Secretary, Ministry of Home Affairs from 26 October 1971 until 1972.

References

External links
 Biography 
 Royal Navy (RN) Officers 1939–1945
 Dictionary of Irish Biography
 1911 Census Return

1907 births
1986 deaths
Alumni of the University of Nottingham
Members of the Senate of Northern Ireland 1961–1965
Members of the Senate of Northern Ireland 1965–1969
Members of the House of Commons of Northern Ireland 1965–1969
Members of the House of Commons of Northern Ireland 1969–1973
Northern Ireland junior government ministers (Parliament of Northern Ireland)
Mayors of Derry
People educated at Foyle College
Place of death missing
Politicians from County Londonderry
Royal Navy officers of World War II
Ulster Unionist Party members of the House of Commons of Northern Ireland
Members of the House of Commons of Northern Ireland for County Londonderry constituencies
Ulster Unionist Party members of the Senate of Northern Ireland
Ulster Unionist Party councillors